This article presents a list of the historical events and publications of Australian literature during 1868.

Books 

 Marcus Clarke – Long Odds
 Maud Jeanne Franc – John's Wife

Short stories 

 Marcus Clarke – "Cannabis Indica : A Psychological Experiment"
 Mary Fortune – "The Tressless Bride"

Poetry 

 Bertha Martin Boyd – "Daniel in the Lion's Den"
 Mary Fortune
 "The Breeze from the South"
 "Farewell to Tamanick"
 Henry Kendall
 "A Death in the Bush"
 "Charles Harpur"
 "Moss on a Wall"
 "Syrinx"
 Henry Parkes – "Brougham"

Births 

A list, ordered by date of birth (and, if the date is either unspecified or repeated, ordered alphabetically by surname) of births in 1868 of Australian literary figures, authors of written works or literature-related individuals follows, including year of death.

 24 February – Jennings Carmichael, poet and writer (died 1904)
 14 May – Mary Eliza Fullerton, writer (died 1946)
 27 June – Randolph Bedford, poet, novelist and short story writer (died 1941)
 29 October – Robert Crawford, poet (died 1930)
 14 November – Steele Rudd, short story writer (died 1935)

Deaths 

A list, ordered by date of death (and, if the date is either unspecified or repeated, ordered alphabetically by surname) of deaths in 1868 of Australian literary figures, authors of written works or literature-related individuals follows, including year of birth.

 10 June – Charles Harpur, poet (born 1813)

See also 
 1868 in Australia
 1868 in literature
1868 in poetry
 List of years in Australian literature
List of years in literature

References

 
Australia
19th-century Australian literature
Australian literature by year